Lee Sze Wing (born 5 May 2001) is a Hong Kong professional racing cyclist. She rode in the women's omnium event at the 2020 UCI Track Cycling World Championships in Berlin, Germany.

References

2001 births
Living people
Hong Kong female cyclists
Place of birth missing (living people)